Jacob Iller (born October 3, 2001) is a United States Virgin Islands international soccer player.

He was called up to represent the national under-20 team during 2020 CONCACAF U-20 Championship qualifying.

Career statistics

International

References

External links
 Wright State Raiders bio

2001 births
Living people
Wright State Raiders men's soccer players
United States Virgin Islands soccer players
United States Virgin Islands international soccer players
Association football defenders
United States Virgin Islands under-20 international soccer players